Michael Dennison Lewis (born 14 October 1967) is a Belizean professional racing cyclist, who twice competed for his native country at the Summer Olympics: 1988 and 1992.

Career

1989
 2nd in Holy Saturday Classic (BIZ)
1992
 1st in Holy Saturday Classic (BIZ)
2003
 2nd in  National Championships, Road, Elite, Belize (BIZ)
2005
 2nd in Holy Saturday Classic (BIZ)
 1st in KREM New Years' Day Cycling Classic (BIZ)
2007
 1st in  National Championships, Road, Elite, Belize (BIZ)
 3rd in Alpheus Williams Classic (BIZ)
2008
 3rd in KREM New Years' Day Cycling Classic (BIZ)

References

External links

1967 births
Living people
Belizean male cyclists
Cyclists at the 1988 Summer Olympics
Cyclists at the 1992 Summer Olympics
Olympic cyclists of Belize
Place of birth missing (living people)